Poul Sørensen (3 August 1906 – 1 July 1951) was a Danish cyclist. He competed in the individual and team road race events at the 1928 Summer Olympics.

References

External links
 

1906 births
1951 deaths
People from Lolland Municipality
Danish male cyclists
Olympic cyclists of Denmark
Cyclists at the 1928 Summer Olympics
Sportspeople from Region Zealand